is a hack and slash video game and the fourth installment in the Dynasty Warriors series.  Dynasty Warriors 4 was developed by Omega Force and published by Koei.  The game is available on PlayStation 2 (PS2) and Xbox and is based on a series of books called Romance of the Three Kingdoms, written by Luo Guanzhong.  As the series has progressed, it has strayed further from the actual plot of Romance of the Three Kingdoms but instead has given the user more input on how the storyline progresses. When it was released in Japan as Shin Sangokumusou 3, it topped the sales charts, sold over one million copies within nine days, and received an average of 78 out of 100 on Metacritics reviews.

Originally released on the PS2 in March 2003, it was later ported to the Xbox in September of the same year and, in 2005, ported to the PC under the name Dynasty Warriors 4 Hyper. Two expansions were released for the PS2 version of the game, Xtreme Legends and Empires. Whereas Xtreme Legends requires the player to use the original Dynasty Warriors 4 disc to access all of its features, Empires is a stand-alone game that can be played without the original disk. The game is the first in the Dynasty Warriors series to introduce an Empires expansion pack and the second to include an Xtreme Legends title. These expansions are not available for the Xbox version of the game.

Gameplay 
Dynasty Warriors 4 expands on its predecessors by adding new characters, new modes of play and a completely new 'Edit Mode.' Instead of having strict routines to follow during battle, officers, to some extent, will have a greater reaction to the events taking place on the battlefield in the game and may react to things more often.

The aim of most of the stages in Dynasty Warriors 4 is to defeat the enemy commander. The player must make their way through the stage, defeating enemy officers and troops while trying to keep their own commander alive. Some stages have secondary objectives for the player to complete to make the stage easier, unlock new features, or help in later stages.  Each playable character has their own unique weapon and individual superhuman abilities. The scope of each stage allows for each side to have thousands of soldiers in the battlefield. The game uses a fairly simple combination system so that players can chain attacks together; the highest possible attack combo being 10. New character designs and attack moves are also updated, leaving more damage and raising your characters skill up more easily.

Playable starting officers include Liu Bei, Zhang Fei, and Guan Yu for the Shu Kingdom; Xiahou Dun, Cao Cao, Xiahou Yuan for the Wei Kingdom; and Sun Shang Xiang, Huang Gai, and Sun Jian for the Wu Kingdom. It is possible to unlock new characters from other kingdoms as well as use a player created character in any of the campaigns. The new 'Edit Mode' allows players to create an officer from sets of different features, motions, and weapons to use in 'Kaiba Mode.' The characters stance and motion are affected by their gender and the weapon the player has selected them to carry and use. The motions for the weapons are taken from pre-existing officers as well as from two characters removed from Dynasty Warriors 4 that were in Dynasty Warriors 3: Fu Xi and Nu Wa. Some characters are unlocked by fulfilling optional side-goals; most are unlocked by completing certain battles during gameplay. The maximum number of playable characters is 42, 46 with created characters.

Each playable character in the game has the ability to equip items. Weapons in the game, unlike its predecessors, are gained in levels. Some items are only found in certain stages, but is only obtainable if completing a goal. Sometimes the goal may be very simple, but some may be not that easy to figure out how to obtain the certain item. By defeating generals and lieutenants, the player's character is awarded experience scaled by the difficulty of each officer, and the amount of them defeated. This experience is allocated at the end of the level and allows the player to increase their attributes or obtain new forms. Each playable officer has 9 levels to achieve with their standard weapon, while a 10th level is accessible through special in-game requirements, and on the "Hard" difficulty, which is found to be frustrating like most games, the harder the difficulty the more eager you gain. Items can have a number of effects on the player such as increasing attack power, defense, and movement speed. You can also retrieve your health level to avoid getting killed and having "Game Over" by obtaining "Chinese Meatbuns" that at first, look like onions like in any other game in the so far successful Dynasty Warriors franchise. You can also obtain item boost that increase a certain skill by 2 for limited time only. You can also get packs of wine and packs of Chinese Meatbuns in certain stages in certain locations during gameplay. As said above, special items can also be unlocked by completing objectives during gameplay. Special items can grant the player a statistics boost, a unique ability or skill, or even a ride-able mount such as an Elephant or Horse.

'Musou Mode,' the main campaign mode, has separate campaigns for each kingdom rather than a separate 'Musou Mode' for each character, as was featured in Dynasty Warriors 3, which made it more frustrating for the player to unlock their favorite characters. So, Dynasty Warriors 4 Mosou Modes are easier for the player to unlock their favorite characters. While the storyline is still linear, 'Musou Mode' is rather open-ended in the sense that depending on the user's actions, different events will occur, such as unlocking new characters for use or new kingdoms. The unlockable kingdoms in the game include the Wu, Shu, and Wei Kingdoms, and unlockable characters include warlords who were defeated in the book that the game series is based on, Romance of the Three Kingdoms.

In-game features include large battlefields, a large number of enemies and officers to defeat, and multiple outcomes for each stage. Certain levels make use of the siege engine (A new feature to the series) and introduce specialized siege equipment such as bridge layers, battering rams and catapults to the stage. Although it is not essential for the completion of stages, having a siege weapon will increase morale for the player's forces, and help the player succeed.

The morale system in the game is similar to previous Dynasty Warrior games. Morale is increased and decreased by performing a number of positive actions for the player's army. Action that produce this effect include defeating enemies in multiples of fifty, defeating enemy officers, and completing special events such as ambushes, siege attacks, and finding enemy strongholds. Morale in the game has a strong effect on the player's forces, determining their strength and speed, as well as their ability to perform Berwald attacks. Morale will also affect how the CPU characters move along through battle. Example: Ally Oxenstiernas are winning.
They are more likely to charge the enemy and destroy the enemies in the path. They may or may not stop if the charging armies morale drops to losing. More chances they'll stop and stay where they are, or they'll flee back to the ally side of the battlefield.

Occasionally, when the player confronts an enemy officer, the officer will challenge them to a one-on-one duel. If the player accepts, they will be transported to a small arena away from the main battlefield where a one-on-one fight with the officer will take place until either is victorious or time runs out. If the player declines, your morale will drop. If the player wins, their morale will rise and the enemy officer will be removed from the battlefield. If you accept the officers challenge they do become more difficult to beat in the duel.

Plot

Setting 
Dynasty Warriors 4 is set in Ancient China during the time of the Three Kingdoms era. The game begins at the fall of the Han Dynasty, shortly before the death of Emperor Ling when the Yellow Turban Rebellion led by Zhang Jiao begun an uprising against the Empire. A number of elements in the game build on aspects of Chinese Mythology and there is a mix between fact and fiction as the game is built on the story of Romance of the Three Kingdoms.

Many of the locations, characters, and events in Dynasty Warriors 4 are reported to have happened in Chinese history although many have been exaggerated to make the game more appealing to the player. There are also some features that are historically inaccurate. The game features environments resembling that of ancient China and various items from the era. Common items throughout the game include Fairy Wine and Dim Sum's.

Stages 
Many of the stages are recreations of notable battles present historically or from the novel Romance of the Three Kingdoms, while original creations became more common with the newer installments. Of course, the battlefields are not exact reproductions of the original locations, as newer establishments, buildings and other facilities have been built on top of them. For example, He Fei, a key site in both the game and in the historical context, has been developed and expanded into an urbanised area, making an exact replication impossible. Instead, levels are designed to be vaguely accurate, focusing more on expression of mood and effects; these are not re-used in every game, but are instead updated in every Dynasty Warriors game, save the games' extension packages - in this case, Dynasty Warriors 4: Xtreme Legends and Dynasty Warriors 4: Empires

Characters 
* Denotes new characters to the series

* Denotes new characters to the series
Bold denotes default characters
Note: Fu Xi and Nü Wa were removed in DW4

Story 
Although Dynasty Warriors 4 does allow for some player input into how the story unfolds, the three main kingdoms' 'Musou Modes' follow the main events of the Romance of the Three Kingdoms story.

Han and Allied Forces Story 
In 184 AD, with the corruption and poverty within the Han dynasty, Zhang Jiao and a religious sect known as the Way of Peace start a rebellion within China, attracting hundreds of thousands of followers. In response to this threat, Regent Marshal He Jin gathers generals from across the land to combat the "Yellow Turban Rebellion". Among the volunteers for the Han Forces are Cao Cao of Chang'an, Sun Jian of Jianye, and Liu Bei. The Han forces are able to destroy Zhang Liang, who is laying siege to Huangfu Song at Xiapi Castle. They proceed to drive Zhang Bao out of his fortress at He Nan Yin and the whole Han army triumphs over Zhang Jiao himself in Ji Province (If Zhang Jiao withdraws from the battle, one of the forces, either Wei, Wu, or Shu, will defeat Zhang Jiao and Zhang Lu in Hanzhong).

With Zhang Jiao and his followers dead, it is Dong Zhuo who seizes power within the Imperial Court. Followed by Lu Bu and Diaochan, he enslaves Emperor Xian and makes himself regent in place of the deceased He Jin. In 190 AD, the powerful nobleman Yuan Shao rallies an army of warriors from across the land, including Cao Cao, Sun Jian, Liu Bei, Gongsun Zan, and many fresh warriors. These forces defeat Li Jue and Hua Xiong at Si Shui Gate and, at Hulao Gate a year later, they defeat Dong Zhuo and Lu Bu; Dong Zhuo survives, and burns down Luoyang.

Shu Story 
After defeating Dong Zhuo, Liu Bei and his sworn brothers Zhang Fei and Guan Yu are forced to wander the land in search of a home. Since the people love Liu Bei, Cao Cao sets out to destroy him. In 200 AD, Guan Yu returns to Liu Bei after an escape ("Tales"), making it through many gates to ships on the river. At Ru Nan ("Tales"), Liu Bei is rejoined by Guan Yu and is now followed by Zhao Yun, who saves him from advancing infantry. Cao Cao is defeated, but Liu Bei must continue wandering. In 208 AD, Liu Bei finds talent in a strategist known as Zhuge Liang, who agreed to follow him after Liu Bei visited him three times. Zhuge Liang proves his worth by defeating Cao Cao's army in a series of ambushes at the Battle of Bo Wan Po and Liu Bei successfully manages to flee to Sun Jian in Wu after the Battle of Changban, where Zhao Yun saved his son. Sun Jian agrees to assist Liu Bei in his goal of defeating Cao Cao, and Wu strategist Zhou Yu teams up with Zhuge Liang to execute a fire attack that destroyed Cao Cao's fleet at the Battle of Chi Bi.

After Chi Bi, Liu Bei focused on building up his kingdom. He took over Luo Castle from his cousin Liu Zhang after the people pleaded for his guidance (although he lost Pang Tong), and also unified Jing Province after defeating Han Xuan of Changsha, Liu Du of Lingling, Zhao Fan of Guiyang, and Jin Xuan of Wuling. He gained Huang Zhong and Wei Yan as officers after this battle, and his great army conquered the rest of Yi Province at Chengdu in 214 AD. Soon after, he assisted Ma Chao at the Battle of Tong Pass ("Tales") against Cao Cao, and gained him as a general after Chengdu.

Liu Bei then attacks either Wei or Wu, depending on if the fire attack at Chi Bi succeeds or not. Either Wei or Wu will be the final battle where you attack their capital; the battles are the same.

Liu Bei proceeds to campaign in the southlands to get rid of Wu's threat, as Wu had backed a Nanman rebellion by King Meng Huo. In Nanzhong, he systematically defeated Meng Huo for a total of seven times, as Zhuge Liang cleverly resisted the Nanman armor troops and also pacified the poison marshes. After taking down Meng Huo, Shu proceeded to capture Fan Castle from Wei's Cao Ren, and also defeated Wu reinforcements under Lu Meng and traitors under Mi Fang and Fu Shiren. The final battle with Wu was at the Battle of Yi Ling, where Liu Bei braved a Wu fire attack and defeated (if Wu falls first, kills) Sun Jian and his officers. If Wei has been defeated before Wu, Liu Bei proceeds to attack Jianye, and sees through Sun Jian's body double trickery and kills Sun Jian, Sun Ce, Sun Quan, and Sun Shangxiang.

He also attacks Wei in campaigns masterminded by Zhuge Liang. Zhuge Liang gains Jiang Wei as a general after isolating him and tricking Wei general Ma Zun into thinking that he was betraying him, in a clever ploy at the Battle of Tianshui ("Tales"). He proceeds to defeat the Wei after a failed prisoner exchange at the Battle of Mt. Dingjun and saves Ma Su from defeat at the Battle of Jieting. His final battle with Wei is at the Battle of Wuzhang Plains, where he fakes his death, only to ambush the Wei forces and defeat Sima Yi. If Wu has fallen before Wei, Shu will attack Xuchang, the co-capital of Wei, and take it, with Wei's officers fighting to the death.

Having united the land, Liu Bei will ride on a victory march with his generals, and enter the capital in a glorious procession.

Wei Story 
After Dong Zhuo's defeat, Cao Cao focuses on uniting the land. He is surrounded by enemies: Dong Zhuo's general Lu Bu has taken over all of Dong Zhuo's troops and taken Xiapi Castle; Zhang Xiu has rebelled in Wan Castle; to the north, Yuan Shao threatened to swallow the north whole. Cao Cao defeated Zhang Xiu at Wan Castle, with his guard Dian Wei holding foes back in the burning castle. Cao Cao, having escaped, defeats Lu Bu in alliance with Liu Bei at Xiapi in 198 AD, exterminating his army and gaining several officers. Cao Cao's final victory is at the Battle of Guandu in 200 AD, where he destroys Yuan Shao's army before he even arrives.

After defeating Yuan Shao, Cao Cao proceeds to fight against Liu Bei, who is wandering the land in search of a master. Xiahou Dun pursues and defeats Guan Yu, Liu Bei's brother, who is trying to escape to boats on the Huang He ("Tales"). In 208 AD, Cao Cao wins victories over Zhuge Liang's trickery at Bo Wan Po, defeats a fleeing Liu Bei at Changban, and stops a fire attack ploy by an allied fleet of Sun Jian and Liu Bei at Chi Bi.

Although his southern foes were still very alive, Cao Cao focused to the north to crush Ma Chao and his rebels at Tong Gate in 211 AD ("Tales"). He also chooses to defend against Lu Bu, who is terrorizing Xiapi, and in a fireattack, he ends Lu Bu's Offensive ("Tales"). Cao Cao's generals then destroy the army of the alive Dong Zhuo piecemeal at Ji Province ("Tales"), and he eradicates all of his foes. Cao Cao then chooses to go after Shu or Wu, depending on the result of the Chibi fire attack.

Cao Cao defends against Shu's attacks, with Xiahou Yuan defeating Huang Zhong at Mt. Dingjun in 218 AD after a failed prisoner exchange. Zhuge Liang then makes a new attempt to go north, appointing Ma Su as a subordinate, but Ma Su is encircled at Jieting in 229 AD and his army is decimated by Sima Yi, Cao Cao's strategist. Cao Cao and Sima Yi then defeat Zhuge Liang at the Wuzhang Plains in 234 AD, defeating (or killing, depending on order of conquest) Liu Bei. If Wu has fallen first, Cao Cao proceeds to attack the Shu capital of Chengdu. He gets Wei Yan to defect to his forces and the Wei army seizes both Luo Castle and Chengdu from the Shu forces, and Liu Bei and his peasant militias are killed.

Wei strikes back against Wu, who have attacked them at Fan Castle. Cao Ren successfully defends the fortifications against Lu Meng, who fails to lay siege layers against the walls. At Shiting in 228 AD, Cao Xiu narrowly survives a defection ploy by Zhou Fang, with aid from Sima Yi, who destroys Lu Xun's army. The final battle is at He Fei Castle, where the Wei general Zhang Liao defeats Sun Jian in a series of ambushes. If Shu has been defeated first, Wei will attack the capital at Jianye and every member of the Sun family is killed as the Three Kingdoms come to an end.

Cao Cao and his generals will then make a victory march into the capital, waved at by local peasants.

Wu Story 
Dong Zhuo's defeat has left him holed up in Luoyang, so Sun Jian and his army attack and defeat him in the city, finding the Imperial Seal in the process ("Tales"). Sun Jian then leads his army home, but finds out that Liu Biao has taken over Jing Province, Yan Baihu, Wang Lang, and Liu Yong have conquered the Wu Territory, and Liu Xun has allied with Yuan Shu. At Xiangyang in 192 AD, Sun Jian falls into a trap in the castle but survives and defeats the attackers. His generals also kill off many of Liu Biao's generals and defeat Yuan Shao's reinforcements, and Liu Biao is defeated after interrogating why he invaded Jing. His son Sun Ce continues his conquest, and proceeds to conquer the Wu Territory from the regional lords; Zhou Yu plans his campaign for the lands. With Wu secure, the Sun Family continues on to Mt. Xingshi, where they attack Jiangdong and defeat the armies of Liu Xun and Yuan Shu in 198 AD. If only Liu Xun has been defeated, Sun Jian and his family will participate in a unification of Jing Province, securing all of the cities from the forces of Liu Biao and the three Wu lords.

With their home base secured, Wu looked to external threats. Huang Zu, who had formerly supported Liu Biao, prepared a pirate fleet to attack. Nanman king Meng Huo had shown signs of revolt in the south. In the north, Cao Cao prepared an armada to invade the south. Sun Ce and Zhou Yu defeated Huang Zu with a naval fire attack at Xiakou and convinced Gan Ning to join them, and Zhou Yu inflicted a decisive defeat on Meng Huo's elephant troops in Nanman. To fix the problem with Cao Cao, Sun Jian allied with Liu Bei and defeated Cao Cao's fleet at Chi Bi.

After Chi Bi, Wu continued their conquests. Depending on the result of the fire attack, they will either attack Wei or Shu. Before either, the Wu defeat Dong Zhuo and Meng Huo's combined forces at Chang Jiang ("Tales").

The Wu secured Xiangyang, the Nan Territory, Jiangling, and Jing Province from Wei before Shu's Zhuge Liang could, and also defeated Meng Huo for a second (or third) time in the south. Their final battle against Shu is at Yiling, where they use a fire attack to force Liu Bei to retreat to Bai Di Castle, where he is then defeated (or killed). If Wei has fallen first, Wu will defeat the Shu at Chengdu and occupy the lands of Shu Han, killing their officers.

Wu then faces off with Wei, taking Fan Castle with siege engines. Lu Xun, a new strategists, then defeats Wei at Shiting with a defection ploy involving Zhou Fang. Their final victory at He Fei Castle gives them control of the region. If Shu has fallen first, the Wu will proceed to Xuchang and take it after a siege.

With the land in their hands, the Wu have a victory march into the capital city.

Yuan Shao Story 
Yuan Shao, having humbled the Yellow Turbans and the army of Dong Zhuo, proceeded to attack his rival Cao Cao. After defeating Cao Cao at Guan Du, Yuan Shao destroys Wei and kills all of their generals. With the tyrant dead, he focuses on defeating Liu Bei and Sun Jian. He fights two campaigns against them, defeating Sun Jian at Hefei and Liu Bei in Xiapi. The two heroes' deaths let him take control of the whole land.

Nanman Story 
The Nanman are absent from both the Yellow Turban Campaign and the War against Dong Zhuo. Instead, they are living peacefully in the south, but are defeated several times by Shu invaders. King Meng Huo is infuriated, but his wife Zhu Rong invigorates him to send them back to their lands and destroy them. After a single battle for Nanzhong, Meng Huo forces Zhuge Liang's army out of his home.

Meng Huo's army marches northwards to attack Liu Bei. However, his army is swept down the Changjiang and end up in the Kingdom of Wu, ruled by Sun Jian. The Nanman resolve to take Jianye from Wu, and Meng Huo kills every member of the Sun family in rapid succession. With Jianye down, Meng Huo proceeds to attack into Wei. He captures Xuchang and kills every Wei officer, although Sima Yi's efforts to launch an attack on the Nanman supply depot cause temporary chaos.

Meng Huo and his Nanman army then march on Chengdu, the Shu capital. The Nanman troops are held back from the bridges by Zhang Bao and Guan Suo, who hold the Nanman back to defend the legacy of their fathers (Zhang Fei and Guan Yu, respectively). Meng Huo kills the last of Shu's generals and conquers the land.

Lu Bu Story 
Lu Bu fights for Dong Zhuo at the Battle of Si Shui Gate, fighting off invaders that are supposed to depose him. Lu Bu then defeats the Coalition at Hu Lao Gate, but they are not done for yet. Also, he finds that Dong Zhuo is truly a monster, and starts a revolt in Wan Castle and cuts him down. Now in charge of Dong Zhuo's army, he defeats Cao Cao, Liu Bei, and Sun Jian in several campaigns, and takes over the land.

Dong Zhuo Story 
Dong Zhuo learns that the Coalition of Yuan Shao has finally started to attack, and he defeats them at Si Shui Gate and Hu Lao Gate. Afterwards, he defeats Lu Bu, who is trying to revolt against him, and defeats the rebels. His final act is to destroy Cao Cao, Liu Bei, and Sun Jian at Guandu, Xiapi, and Hefei. He rides into the capital on a victory march, taking over the land.

Yellow Turban Story 
Zhang Jiao, leader of the Yellow Turban Rebellion, finds out that the Han army has moved at last, and they are preparing to attack him. He defeats Sun Jian, Liu Bei, and Cao Cao in a series of campaigns at Hefei, Xiapi, and Guandu, respectively. He then defeats the Han at Xiapi Castle, held by Huangfu Song, and then defeats Zhu Jun at He Nan Yin. Finally, he defeats the Coalition (including Dong Zhuo and Lu Bu) in Ji Province, and the Han fall to his feet. His men enter the capital, as the Way of Peace have taken over the land.

Development 
Due to the success of Dynasty Warriors 3, Omega Force began development on the sequel, Dynasty Warriors 4, and its expansions. The fourth game in the series was the first to introduce an Empires expansion, but it wasn't designed by the same person who designed Dynasty Warriors 4, Tomohiko Sho. Although he was not the designer for all of the Dynasty Warriors games he was involved in the production for them, usually as the planner. Omega Force works under Koei as an internal development team and have mainly concentrated on the Dynasty Warriors series and the Samurai Warriors series. Similarities have been pointed out between the two series, such as the Xtreme Legends and Empires expansions, as well as a similar voice cast that has been used throughout a number of the games from each series. Repeated voices between games include Beau Billingslea, Steven Jay Blum and Richard Epcar.

Audio 
The Dynasty Warriors series has never used the musical style commonly made in the era that the games are set in. Dynasty Warriors 4 is no different and features a similar style of music to Dynasty Warriors 3, using a mix of rock, metal, and heavy metal with undertones of traditional Chinese music. However, this does not detract from the fact that there are a large number of varied tracks throughout the game. The ending song of the game, "Cross Colors," is performed by Yuki Koyanagi and the music was composed by Kazuhiro Hara. The song was performed in both Japanese and English by the same singer and was released for the US and Japanese versions of the game.

Reception 

Before its main release, Dynasty Warriors 4 was already looking promising after GameSpot UK's preview two months before the game was released. Although still very similar to previous titles in the series, the graphics engine had been tweaked and the gameplay been expanded, featuring more characters and stages.

After its release, it had high sales rates in Japan, selling over one million copies a short time after release. Its release in the US did not create as much hype as in Japan mainly because the market for the Dynasty Warriors series is smaller there, but it still sold fairly well and together with the Japanese sales, Dynasty Warriors 4 entered into the Greatest Hits charts. In its time Dynasty Warriors 4 has managed to become IGN's 5th best co-operative game on the PS2 as well. The game has sold 2.2 million copies. The game is criticized for being very similar to older games in the series and retaining some of the features such as the fogging and repetitive gameplay. Even with these drawbacks, Koei went on to release two expansions for Dynasty Warriors 4 Xtreme Legends and Dynasty Warriors 4 Empires. It had also been ported to the Xbox and to the PC as a Hyper edition. Armchair Empire commented that when there is a lot happening on screen at once, the game tended to slow down.

The English voice acting for the series, commonly criticized as being poor, has remained in DW4. The English voice-overs of Dynasty Warriors series uses straightforward English pronunciations for the romanized pinyin names of characters and locations. The results tend to leave errors in the dialogue, with incorrect English pronunciations of originally Chinese text.

Versions and expansions 
Dynasty Warriors 4 has had two expansions and a re-release. The first was Dynasty Warriors 4 Xtreme Legends and added new gameplay options and modes. The second was Dynasty Warriors 4 Empires, which added a strategy mode of gameplay to the original. Hyper is a port of Dynasty Warriors 4 to Windows 2000/Windows XP.

Dynasty Warriors 4: Xtreme Legends 
 is a PlayStation 2 Dynasty Warriors 4 expansion developed by Omega Force and published by Koei. This expansion was released in Europe and the United States on November 4, 2003. DW4XL, as it is sometimes abbreviated, has slightly improved weather effects and character reflections within the overall graphics.

The expansion adds new difficulty levels ('Beginner' and 'Expert') and new modes of play ('Arena Challenge' and 'Legend' modes). In 'Arena Challenge Mode,' the player can engage one-on-one duels against various opponents, where they'll be rewarded if they win. The new 'Legend Mode' elaborates on the individual prowess of each individual warrior within Dynasty Warriors. Individual weapons are given the availability to have an 11th evolved state, increasing the weapon's stats further. Due to the great emphasis in the duelling system in this expansion, it is at times seen as its own individual game - separate from the original Dynasty Warriors 4.

Dynasty Warriors 4: Empires 
Dynasty Warriors 4: Empires (真・三國無双3 Empires (Shin Sangokumusou 3 Empires) in Japan) is the second expansion of Dynasty Warriors 4, released exclusively for the PlayStation 2 on August 31, 2004, in the United States and Europe. The game adds a new strategy mode called 'Empire Mode' which is based on the Romance of the Three Kingdoms series. However, the gameplay during attacking or defending against opposing forces is exactly the same as the original Dynasty Warriors 4. The main goal in Empire Mode is to conquer the land in order to beat the game, by invading and conquering all areas and territories of China.  In addition, the Japanese voices were added into the PS2 version of Dynasty Warriors 4 Empires for the American version.

In 'Empire Mode,' the player can choose a ruler for their forces, along with two main generals. Three minor lieutenants can also be chosen for support. In battle, the capture of enemy officers is possible by lowering their morale and defeating them. If, at the end of the battle, the player is victorious, it is possible to hire the captured officer or, alternatively, release them.
Before every battle, the player is given the choice of using 'Political Tactics,' such as increasing or decreasing time limit of battles or preventing enemy reinforcements from arriving during battles. The player can also secure alliances with other forces; these alliances can change how the game progresses, such as requesting reinforcements from the allied forces against opposing forces. However, these alliances only last for a set time decided by the tactic used. There's also an 'Archives Mode' that shows the motions and voices of the officers. A gallery of character artworks and game movies is also presented within the Archives Mode.

Dynasty Warriors 4: Hyper 
The PC version of the game hosts several exclusive features, such as improved graphics, higher resolution options, more characters onscreen, improved draw distance, optional Japanese dialogue, and improved enemy AI. However, it does not contain the additional content from Dynasty Warriors 4: Xtreme Legends.

References 

2003 video games
Cooperative video games
Koei games
Dynasty Warriors
PlayStation 2 games
PlayStation Network games
Xbox games
Windows games
Crowd-combat fighting games
Video games developed in Japan
Video games set in China
Video games based on Chinese mythology
Multiplayer and single-player video games